Bear Kill is a river which flows into the Schoharie Creek southeast of Grand Gorge, New York. The creek flows over Hardenburgh Falls.

References

Rivers of New York (state)
Rivers of Schoharie County, New York
Rivers of Delaware County, New York